Diazodiphenylmethane is an organic reagent with the chemical formula C13H10N2. It exists as red-black crystals that melts just above room temperature.

Preparation 
Diazodiphenylmethane can be synthesized via the oxidation of benzophenone hydrazone with mercury(II) oxide in diethyl ether and the presence of a basic catalyst. An improved procedure involves dehydrogenation with oxalyl chloride.

Uses 
It can be used to synthesise (diphenyl)methyl esters and ethers with carboxylic acids and alcohols respectively.

It can also generate the (diphenyl)methyl carbene and nitrogen gas upon illumination by ultraviolet light or heating. It can also be electrolysed to form the Ph2CN anion, which can decompose to form the Ph2C− anion radical. If carried out in dimethylformamide and tetrabutylammonium perchlorate, these can react to form benzophenone azine, which has the formula Ph2C=N-N=CPh2.

References 

Diazo compounds
Phenyl compounds